The members of the sixth National Assembly of South Korea were elected on 26 November 1963. The assembly sat from 17 December 1963 until 30 June 1967.

Members

Seoul

Busan

Gyeonggi

Gangwon

North Chungcheong

South Chungcheong

North Jeolla

South Jeolla

North Gyeongsang

South Gyeongsang

Jeju

Proportional representation

See also 

 1963 South Korean legislative election
 National Assembly (South Korea)#History

Notes

References 

006
National Assembly members 006